The parabasalids are a group of flagellated protists within the supergroup Excavata. Most of these eukaryotic organisms form a symbiotic relationship in animals. These include a variety of forms found in the intestines of termites and cockroaches, many of which have symbiotic bacteria that help them digest cellulose in woody plants.  Other species within this supergroup are known parasites, and include human pathogens.

Characteristics

The flagella are arranged in one or more clusters near the anterior of the cell.  Their basal bodies are linked to parabasal fibers that attach to prominent Golgi complexes, distinctive to the group.  Usually they also give rise to a sheet of cross-like microtubules that runs down the center of the cell and in some cases projects past the end.  This is called the axostyle, but is different in structure from the axostyles of oxymonads.

Parabasalids are anaerobic, and lack mitochondria, but this is now known to be a result of secondary loss, and they contain small hydrogenosomes which apparently developed from reduced mitochondria. Similar relics have been found in other amitochondriate flagellates, and the parabasalids are probably related to them, forming a group called the metamonads.  They lack the feeding grooves found in most others, but this is probably a secondary loss as well.

Classification
Before reclassification, the parabasalids are currently divided into about 7 to 10 orders depending on sources. Present classification divided Parabasalia into 4 orders, that is, Trichonymphida, Spirotrichonymphida, Cristamonadida, and Trichomonadida. 

 The trichomonads have one group of 4-6 flagella, one of which is attached to the side of the cell and often forms an undulating membrane.  Many are found in vertebrate hosts, including Trichomonas vaginalis, which causes a sexually transmitted disease in humans.
 The other orders, formerly grouped as the hypermastigids, have a large number of flagellar clusters and are found exclusively in the guts of insects. (The term "Hypermastigida" is still occasionally encountered.)

References

Flagellates
Metamonads